Limansky (masculine), Limanskaya (feminine), or Limanskoye (neuter) is the name of several rural localities in Russia:
Limansky, Krasnodar Krai, a settlement in Chepiginsky Rural Okrug of Bryukhovetsky District of Krasnodar Krai
Limansky, Rostov Oblast, a khutor in Zolotarevskoye Rural Settlement of Semikarakorsky District of Rostov Oblast